Ipswich Buses is a bus company that operates in Ipswich, Suffolk. It is owned by Ipswich Borough Council.

The company operates buses throughout the town and surrounding villages. Its depot is situated in Constantine Road, near Ipswich Town's Portman Road football ground. First Norfolk & Suffolk also operate bus services in the town on complementary routes.

History

The origins of Ipswich Buses can be traced to November 1903 when Ipswich Corporation commenced operating trams. In 1923 the trams were replaced by trolleybuses. Buses were introduced from August 1950. To comply with the Transport Act 1985, in 1986 the assets of Ipswich Corporation were transferred to a new legal entity, Ipswich Buses.

In February 2016, a deal was finalised to take over the staff, bus routes and most vehicles of independent operator Carter's Coach Services.

Services
As at December 2022 Ipswich Buses operate 23 routes.

Park & ride
Ipswich Buses operated the Ipswich park & ride system under contract to Suffolk County Council from 1997 until 2008 when First Eastern Counties took over the service. In November 2013 Ipswich Buses recommenced operating the park and ride service. In July 2017 First Norfolk & Suffolk took over its operation.

Fleet
As at March 2022 the fleet consisted of 78 buses.

See also
Trolleybuses in Ipswich
List of bus operators of the United Kingdom

References

External links

Company website

Bus operators in Suffolk
Companies owned by municipalities of England
Transport companies established in 1903
Transport in Ipswich
1903 establishments in England
Companies based in Ipswich